Kenge, Bas Congo is a town in Bas-Congo in the Democratic Republic of the Congo.

Transport 
Kenge is served by a station on the national railway system.

See also 
 Railway stations in DRCongo

References 

Populated places in Kongo Central